Hodslavice is a municipality and village in Nový Jičín District in the Moravian-Silesian Region of the Czech Republic. It has about 1,700 inhabitants.

History
The first written mention of Hodslavice is from 1411.

Notable people
František Palacký (1798–1876), historian, politician and influential figure of the Czech National Revival
Josef Hromádka (1889–1969), theologian
Svatopluk Turek (1900–1972), writer

References

Villages in Nový Jičín District